This is a list of letters of the Greek alphabet. The definition of a Greek letter for this list is a character encoded in the Unicode standard that a has script property of 'Greek' and the general category of 'Letter'. An overview of the distribution of Greek letters is given in Greek script in Unicode.

Letters contained in the Modern Greek Alphabet

Extensions

Letters with diacritics

Other characters
Other Greek characters are omitted from the tables above:
Subscript modifier letters β, γ, ρ, φ, and χ: ᵦ ᵧ ᵨ ᵩ ᵪ 
Superscript modifier letters β, γ, δ, φ, and χ: ᵝ ᵞ ᵟ ᵠ ᵡ
Small capitals Γ, Λ, Π, Ρ, Ψ, and Ω: ᴦ ᴧ ᴨ ᴩ ᴪ ꭥ
Glyph variants for β, ε, Θ, θ, κ, ρ, Σ, σ/ς, π, Υ, Ύ, Ϋ, φ: 
OU ligature which is used in Greek but encoded as a Latin letter: Ȣȣ

Footnotes

See also
Greek alphabet
Greek ligatures
Greek letters used in mathematics
Greek numerals

Greek alphabet
Greek letters